The following are the national records in Olympic weightlifting in Hungary. Records are maintained in each weight class for the snatch lift, clean and jerk lift, and the total for both lifts by the Hungarian Weightlifting Federation (HWF).

Current records

Men

Women

Historical records

Men (1998–2018)

Women (1998–2018)

References

External links
 Hungarian Weightlifting Federation web site
 Hungarian records – Men 
 Hungarian records – Women 

Hungary
Records
Olympic weightlifting
weightlifting